Ahmad Saeed Kazmi (1913 – 4 June 1986) was a Pakistani Islamic scholar and Sufi. He migrated to Multan in 1935 from Amroha. He is known for his contribution to the Pakistan Movement, Urdu translation and explanation (Tafseer) of Quran, and Dars-e-Hadith. His tomb sits next to Multan's 18th century Shahi Eid Gah Mosque.

See also

Dargah-e-Ala Hazrat
Mustafa Raza Khan Qadri
Hamid Raza Khan
Syed Shujaat Ali Qadri
Ilyas Qadri
Jamaat Ahle Sunnat
Muhammad Muslehuddin Siddiqui
Syed Waheed Ashraf

References

External links

Audio Files
Books by Kazmi at Kazmis.com

1913 births
1985 deaths
20th-century Muslim scholars of Islam
Pakistani Sufis
People from Amroha district
Raza, Ahmad
Muhajir people
People from Multan
Jamiat Ulema-e-Pakistan politicians
Punjabi Sufis
Translators of the Quran into Urdu
Barelvis
Pakistani people of Arab descent
20th-century translators